Healing the ear of a servant is one of the miracles of Jesus in the Gospels. Only Luke records that Jesus healed the servant.

The Gospel of Luke (22:49-51) describes Jesus healing the servant of a high priest during the Arrest of Jesus after one of the followers of Jesus had cut his right ear off:
When Jesus' followers saw what was going to happen, they said, "Lord, should we strike with our swords?" And one of them struck the servant of the high priest, cutting off his right ear. But Jesus answered, "No more of this!" And he touched the man's ear and healed him.

This healing episode follows the kiss of Judas and is the last miracle reported in the Canonical Gospels prior to the Crucifixion of Jesus.

References

Miracles of Jesus
Supernatural healing